Mount Whewell is a massive mountain (2,945 m) between the mouths of Ironside and Honeycomb Glaciers in the Admiralty Mountains, Victoria Land. Named by Sir James Clark Ross, January 15, 1841, for the Reverend Dr. William Whewell, Master of Trinity College, Cambridge.

Mountains of Victoria Land
Borchgrevink Coast